Jorge Rodrigo Barrios (born August 1, 1976) is an Argentine former professional boxer who held the WBO junior lightweight title.

Professional career

Barrios made his professional boxing debut on August 10, 1996 with a second-round knockout victory. Barrios accumulated a record of 14-0 before his first loss—a disqualification against César Emilio Domine on December 20, 1997.

After the disqualification loss, Barrios went on a 25-0-1-1 streak. Then, on August 9, 2003, Barrios fought in a superfight against Acelino Freitas for the WBA and WBO 130 lb titles. In the eighth round, Freitas was hit while off balance for a knockdown. In the eleventh round, Freitas was knocked down by a left-right combination and spit out his mouthpiece. As the bell rang at the end of the round, however, Barrios was knocked down by a powerful right hand to the chin. Despite the 60-second break between rounds, Freitas followed up early in the twelfth round with another knockdown of Barrios. A few moments later, Barrios went to his knees and wobbled when he stood up, causing the referee to award Freitas a TKO victory. The eleventh round won The Ring magazine's Round of the Year award.

On April 8, 2005, Barrios fought against undefeated WBO junior lightweight champion Mike Anchondo. Even though Anchondo weighed 4¾ lb over the weight limit, Barrios won the title and ended Anchondo's unbeaten streak with a fourth-round TKO.

Barrios' last title defense was against undefeated contender Janos Nagy on May 20, 2006. Barrios ended the fight 49 seconds into the first round with a liver punch knockout.

At the weigh-in before his next scheduled defense—September 16, 2006 against undefeated Joan Guzmán—Barrios was overweight, and so he was stripped of his title. Barrios then lost the fight by split decision.

Barrios was scheduled to fight Juan Manuel Márquez (47-3-1 35 KOs) for the WBC Super Featherweight Title on September 15, 2007. Barrios withdrew from the fight due to injury.

On September 6, 2008, Rocky Juarez, (27-4, 19 KO's) won by TKO at 2:55 in the 11th round of the 12-rounder over  Barrios, (47-3-1, 34 KO's).

Negligent homicide

On January 24, 2010, Barrios was involved in a car accident in which a 20-year-old pregnant woman was killed in the Argentine city of Mar del Plata. Barrios ran a red light and fled the scene after the accident. Barrios turned himself to the police several hours after the accident. He was suspected of driving under the influence of alcohol but it could not proven given his late arrest. On April 4, 2012 Barrios was declared guilty of negligent homicide and sentenced to spend four years in prison. Three weeks later, Barrios was released from prison after paying a AR$ 200,000 bail. 

In November 2014, Barrios finally headed to prison for three and a half years.

Professional boxing record

See also
List of world super-featherweight boxing champions

References

External links

 

|-

1976 births
Living people
Argentine male boxers
Sportspeople from Buenos Aires Province
Super-featherweight boxers
World super-featherweight boxing champions
World Boxing Organization champions
Sportspeople convicted of crimes